David Álvarez (born 13 October 1992) is a Colombian footballer who plays as a centre back.

External links
 
 

1992 births
Living people
Colombian footballers
Colombian expatriate footballers
Association football defenders
Once Caldas footballers
Atlético Junior footballers
Tampico Madero F.C. footballers
Alebrijes de Oaxaca players
Leones F.C. footballers
Monagas S.C. players
Categoría Primera A players
Ascenso MX players
Venezuelan Primera División players
Expatriate footballers in Mexico
Expatriate footballers in Venezuela
Colombian expatriate sportspeople in Mexico
Colombian expatriate sportspeople in Venezuela
People from Itagüí
Sportspeople from Antioquia Department